Philippe Marie Eugène, Count d'Ursel (28 June 1920 – 26 March 2017) was a Swiss-born Belgian alpine skier and a member of the Ursel family. 

He was born in Bern, Switzerland in June 1920 and was a grandson of count Charles d'Ursel. Count d'Ursel competed at the 1948 Winter Olympics in St. Moritz and finished 70th in a field of 111 competitors in the men's downhill event and 39th in a field of 78 competitors in the men's combined event. Count d'Ursel died in March 2017 in Oostkamp, Belgium at the age of 96.

References

1920 births
2017 deaths
Alpine skiers at the 1948 Winter Olympics
Belgian male alpine skiers
Ph
Olympic alpine skiers of Belgium
Sportspeople from Bern
Swiss emigrants to Belgium